is a former Japanese football player.

Club statistics

References

External links

1989 births
Living people
Association football people from Kumamoto Prefecture
Japanese footballers
J2 League players
Yokohama FC players
Matsumoto Yamaga FC players
FC Kariya players
Association football defenders